Choulic is a populated place situated in Pima County, Arizona, United States. The name means "corner" in the O'odham language.

References

Populated places in Pima County, Arizona